The 2014 W-League season is the 20th season of the league's existence, and 11th season of second division women's soccer in the United States. The regular season started on May 10 and ended on July 13. The Los Angeles Blues won their fourth league championship, finishing the season undefeated and tie-free. They scored 63 goals and had only 6 scored against them in 15 regular season & playoff games.

Changes from 2013 season

Name changes 
One team changed their name in the off-season:

Expansion teams 
Five teams were added for the season:

Teams leaving 
Three teams folded or self-relegated following the 2013 season:
Fredericksburg Impact - Fredericksburg, Virginia
VSI Tampa Bay FC - Tampa, Florida
Virginia Beach Piranhas - Virginia Beach, Virginia

Merger
Pali Blues merged with the Los Angeles Strikers to form the Los Angeles Blues.

Standings
As of 7/13/2014

Northeastern Conference

Southeastern Conference

Central Conference

Western Conference

Playoffs
The top two finishers in the Northeastern, Southeastern and Western Conferences and the top three finishers in the Central Conference will qualify for the conference playoffs. The conference winners will play for the 2014 W-League Championship, to be held July 25–27 at the IMG Academy in Bradenton, Florida.

Northeastern Conference Playoff

Southeastern Conference Playoff

Central Conference Playoffs

Western Conference Playoff

W-League Championship

Semi-finals

Third Place Playoff

Championship

Statistical leaders

Top scorers

<small>Source:

Top assists

Source:

|}

Awards
 Most Valuable Player: Mele French (LAB)
 Rookie of the Year: Chloe Logarzo (PRI)
 Defender of the Year: Amanda Naeher (CHE)
 Coach of the Year: Daniel Clitnovici (PRI)
 Goalkeeper of the Year: Genevieve Richard (LAV)
 Playoff MVP: Sarah Killion (LAB)

All-League and All-Conference Teams

Northeastern Conference
F: Ashley Herndon (WAS), Marisa Park (BRSE) *, Katie Yensen (WAS)
M: Laylla da Cruz (NJW), Serina Kashimoto (NYM), Yoreli Rincón (NJW)
D: Sue Alber-Weber (LIR) *, Sam Lofton (WAS) *,  Satara Murray (WAS), Lorina White (NYM)
G: Samantha Depken (NYM)

Southeastern Conference
F: Florence Dadson (GCT), Jade Montgomery (CHE), Maria Jose-Rojas (GCT)
M: Leah Fortune (CHE), Rose Lavelle (DDL), Blakely Mattern (CAR) *
D: Lauren Gorodetsky (ATL), Renee Hurd (GCT),  Kailey Mattison (CAR), Amanda Naeher (CHE) *
G: Robyn Jones (CHE)

Central Conference
F: Arin Gilliland (OTT), Christabel Oduro (OTT), Leticia Skeete (KWU)
M: Catherine Charron-Delage (LAV), Arielle Roy-Petitclerc (QUE), Lisa-Marie Woods (OTT)
D: Marissa Duguay (LAV), Melanie Pickert (TOR),  Melissa Roy (QUE), Shelina Zadorsky (OTT) *
G: Genevieve Richard (LAV) *

Western Conference
F: Danica Evans (COR) *, Chloe Logarzo (PRI) *, Mallory Weber (PRI)
M: Jessica Ayers (PRI), Mele French (LAB) *, Sarah Killion (LAB) *
D: Rachel Daly (LAB), Danielle Johnson (BAB), Holly King (PRI),  Kandace Love (LAB)
G: Anna Maria Picarelli (SEA)

* denotes All-League player

References

USL W-League (1995–2015) seasons
2
W